The Château de Miramont is a ruined castle in the commune of Barbaira in the Aude département of France.

The castle is the property of the commune. It has been listed since 1926 as a monument historique by the French Ministry of Culture.

See also
List of castles in France

References

External links
 

Monuments historiques of Aude
Ruined castles in Occitania (administrative region)